Triphenylphosphine oxide (often abbreviated TPPO) is the organophosphorus compound with the formula OP(C6H5)3,  also written as Ph3PO or PPh3O (Ph = C6H5).  This colourless crystalline compound is a common but potentially useful waste product in reactions involving triphenylphosphine.  It is a popular reagent to induce the crystallizing of chemical compounds.

Structure and properties
Ph3PO is a tetrahedral molecule related to POCl3. The oxygen center is relatively basic. The rigidity of the backbone and the basicity of the oxygen center make this species a popular agent to crystallize otherwise difficult to crystallize molecules.  This trick is applicable to molecules that have acidic hydrogen atoms, e.g. phenols.

Up to now, several modifications of Ph3PO have been found: For example, a monoclinic form crystalizes in the space group P21/c with Z = 4 and a = 15.066(1) Å, b = 9.037(2) Å, c = 11.296(3) Å, and β = 98.47(1)°. The orthorhombic modification crystallizes in the space group Pbca with Z = 4 and 29.089(3) Å, b = 9.1347(9), c = 11.261(1) Å.

TPPO's unique application as a heat-diffuser in many electronic devices is used by law enforcement to train electronics-sniffing dogs.

As a byproduct of organic synthesis
Ph3PO is a byproduct of many useful reactions in organic synthesis including the Wittig, Staudinger, and Mitsunobu reactions. It is also formed when PPh3Cl2 is employed to convert alcohols into alkyl chlorides:
Ph3PCl2 + ROH → Ph3PO + HCl + RCl

Triphenylphosphine can be regenerated from the oxide by treatment with a variety of deoxygenation agents, such as phosgene or trichlorosilane/triethylamine:
Ph3PO + SiHCl3 → PPh3 + 1/n (OSiCl2)n + HCl

Triphenylphosphine oxide can be difficult to remove from reaction mixtures by means of chromatography. It is poorly soluble in hexane and cold diethyl ether. Trituration or chromatography of crude products with these solvents often leads to a good separation of triphenylphosphine oxide. Its removal is facilitated by conversion to its Mg(II) complex, which is poorly soluble in toluene or dichloromethane and can be filtered off. An alternative filtration method where ZnCl2(TPPO)2 is formed upon addition of ZnCl2 may be used with more polar solvents such as ethanol, ethyl acetate and tetrahydrofuran.

Coordination chemistry

Ph3PO is a ligand for "hard" metal centers. A representative complex is the tetrahedral species NiCl2(OPPh3)2.

Ph3PO is a common impurity in PPh3. The oxidation of PPh3 by oxygen, including air, is catalyzed by many metal ions:
2 PPh3 + O2 → 2 Ph3PO

References

Organophosphine oxides
Phenyl compounds